Alexander Shakarov (born 8 March 1948 in Baku, Azerbaijan SSR, USSR) is a Soviet chess player, coach and author of Armenian descent.

He is best known for being Garry Kasparov's coach from 1976 to 2005. Together they wrote Caro-Kann: Classical 4…Bf5 book (1984). Kasparov said: "The name of Alexander Shakarov might not be world famous, but hardly anyone has lived a life more dedicated to chess. He is one of the most dedicated workers I've ever met."

Shakarov was also the trainer of Ashot Nadanian.

The fourth chapter of Tibor Karolyi's 2009 book Genius in the Background is devoted to him.

Books

References

Further reading

External links

Alexander Shakarov chess games - 365Chess.com

1948 births
Living people
Russian people of Armenian descent
Chess players from Baku
Russian chess players
Soviet chess players
Armenian chess players
Chess writers
Chess coaches